Qasemabad (also Romanized as Qāsemābād) is a village in Balaband Rural District, in the Central District of Fariman County, Razavi Khorasan Province, Iran. At the 2006 census, its population was 93, in 19 families.

References 

Populated places in Fariman County